Spermatogenesis-associated protein 7 is a protein that in humans is encoded by the SPATA7 gene.

References

Further reading